Mixed Marriage by St John Greer Ervine was written for the Abbey Theatre, Dublin, where it premiered in 1911.

Synopsis 
Set in Belfast, the play follows the Rainey family. As the city's factories come out on strike, John Rainey, the respected head of a Protestant family, acts to calm the sectarian tension being stirred up by politicians for their own ends. He succeeds in uniting his fellow working men against the factory owners. His son Hugh Rainey announces that his wishes to marry the beautiful Nora Murray, a Catholic. John Rainey's beliefs are challenged. He retracts his support from the strike and as a result the rioting intensifies. In the final act of the play, the Raineys are trapped in their house as the riot rages outside. Nora Murray, riddled with guilt, runs out into the street and is shot dead.

Production history

Abbey Theatre, Dublin, 1911 
The original production opened on Sunday 16 April 1911 at the Abbey Theatre, Dublin, directed by Lennox Robinson. It was subsequently revived at the Abbey in 1920 and 1922.

Cast
 Sinclair, Arthur as John Rainey
 O'Neill, Máire (Molly) as Mrs Rainey
 JKerrigan, J.M. as Hugh Rainey
 Wright, Udolphus as Tom Rainey
 Nic Shiubhlaigh, Máire as Nora Murray
 O'Rourke, J. A. as Michael O'Hara

Finborough Theatre, London, 2011 
To mark the centenary of the play, the Finborough Theatre mounted a production of Mixed Marriage which ran from 4-29 October 2011. The critically acclaimed production, directed by Sam Yates, was described as "The most compelling play in London" in a review by Guardian theatre critic Michael Billingon.

Cast
 John Rainey Daragh O'Malley
 Mrs Rainey Fiona Victory
 Hugh Rainey Christopher Brandon
 Tom Rainey Joel Ormsby
 Nora Murray Nora-Jane Noone
 Michael O'Hara Damien Hannaway

1911 plays